Krueppel-like factor 6 is a protein that in humans is encoded by the KLF6 gene.

It is a tumor suppressor gene.

Function 

This gene encodes a nuclear protein that has three zinc fingers at the end of its C-terminal domain, a serine/threonine-rich central region, and an acidic domain lying within the N-terminal region. The zinc fingers of this protein are responsible for the specific DNA binding with the guanine-rich core promoter elements. The central region might be involved in activation or posttranslational regulatory pathways, and the acidic N-terminal domain might play an important role in the process of transcriptional activation. It is capable of activating transcription approximately 4-fold either on homologous or heterologous promoters. The DNA binding and transcriptional activity of this protein, in conjunction with its expression pattern, suggests that this protein may participate in the regulation and/or maintenance of the basal expression of pregnancy-specific glycoprotein genes and possibly other TATA box-less genes. Two transcript variants encoding the same protein have been found for this gene.

Interactions 

KLF6 has been shown to interact with Sp1 transcription factor.

See also 
 Kruppel-like factors

References

Further reading

External links 
 

Transcription factors